Wayne Ewasko is a Canadian politician, who was elected to the Legislative Assembly of Manitoba in the 2011 election. He represents the electoral district of Lac du Bonnet as a member of the Manitoba Progressive Conservative Party caucus. He currently Serves as The Minister of Education and Early Childhood learning. Ewasko is noteworthy as both a politician and a curler having previously been to the 2006, 2009, 2010, 2013, 2014 and 2017 provincial championships. His brother Greg is a top ice technician with Curling Canada. He was re-elected in the 2016 and 2019 provincial elections.

Electoral record

References

External links
Wayne Ewasko

Living people
Progressive Conservative Party of Manitoba MLAs
Curlers from Manitoba
People from Eastman Region, Manitoba
21st-century Canadian politicians
Year of birth missing (living people)